Watkins Glen Commercial Historic District is a national historic district located at Watkins Glen in Schuyler County, New York.  It encompasses 33 contributing buildings in the central business district of Watkins Glen. It developed between about 1844 and 1939 and includes notable examples of Greek Revival, Italianate, Classical Revival, Colonial Revival, Second Empire and Romanesque Revival style architecture.  Notable buildings include the Watkins Glen Municipal Building (1939), Watkins Glen Fire Station (1935), Watkins State Bank (1911), Hotel Kendall (1891), Haring Building (1844), former Watkins Post Office (1905), Freer Opera House (c. 1860), and the Durand Block (1897).

It was listed on the National Register of Historic Places in 2012.

References

Historic districts on the National Register of Historic Places in New York (state)
Greek Revival architecture in New York (state)
Italianate architecture in New York (state)
Neoclassical architecture in New York (state)
Colonial Revival architecture in New York (state)
Second Empire architecture in New York (state)
Romanesque Revival architecture in New York (state)
Buildings and structures in Schuyler County, New York
National Register of Historic Places in Schuyler County, New York